Edwin L. Goldwasser (March 9, 1919 — December 14, 2016) was an American physicist and Co-Founder of the Fermi National Accelerator Laboratory and the field of particle physics. He was a Professor of Physics Emeritus and former Vice Chancellor of Academic Affairs at the University of Illinois, as well as the first Deputy Director of Fermi National Accelerator Laboratory. His interests were photons, cosmic rays, charged particles and  elementary particles. He was Fellow to the American Association for the Advancement of Science and American Physical Society (elected in 1961). He was a Guggenheim Fellow for the academic year 1957–1958.

Life and career

Ned was born in Manhattan, attending the Horace Mann school and later graduating at Harvard, majoring in physics and graduating in 1940. His first job was in the Navy, working as a civilian physicist for the Bureau of Ordnance

Goldwasser's father was I. Edwin Goldwasser, a teacher, philanthropist, and businessman.

References

External links 

1919 births
2016 deaths
American physicists
Jewish physicists
Jewish American scientists
People associated with Fermilab
Fellows of the American Association for the Advancement of Science
Fellows of the American Physical Society
Scientists from New York City
People from Manhattan
University of Illinois Urbana-Champaign faculty
Harvard College alumni
21st-century American Jews